Kurgashtamak (Qurğaştamaq) is a rural locality (a village) in Oktyabrsky Selsoviet, Blagoveshchensky District, Bashkortostan, Russia. The population was 8 as of 2010. There is 1 street.

Geography 
Kurgashtamak is located 72 km northeast of Blagoveshchensk (the district's administrative centre) by road. Usa-Stepanovka is the nearest rural locality.

References 

Rural localities in Blagoveshchensky District